Worsley and Eccles South is a county constituency represented in the House of Commons of the Parliament of the United Kingdom. The seat is currently held by Barbara Keeley MP of the Labour Party. It elects one Member of Parliament (MP) by the first past the post system of election.

Constituency profile
The constituency covers the western half of the City of Salford, mostly safe Labour territory, but the seat also contains two of the Conservatives' strongest wards in the relatively affluent areas of Worsley and Boothstown & Ellenbrook; these are also the only two Remain-voting wards in the constituency. Worsley itself is a desirable area with attractions including historic manor houses along the Bridgewater Canal and the recently-opened 150-acre RHS Garden Bridgewater.

The largest town is actually the town of Walkden, mostly Labour-leaning, and it also includes the Little Hulton council estate. The "Eccles South" signifies the Barton and Winton suburbs of the town of Eccles. In the far south-west of the constituency along the ship canal are the villages of Irlam and Cadishead, separated from the other settlements by swathes of green belt land and farms in the form of Chat Moss, a protected peatland area.

In the 2019 general election, the BBC's exit poll forecast it as a Conservative gain, but it was not in fact among the many leave-supporting red wall seats to fall, and Labour held on although with a reduced, albeit comfortable, majority.

Boundaries

Following its 2006 review of parliamentary representation in Greater Manchester, the Boundary Commission for England recommended the creation of a modified Worsley constituency, incorporating a part of Eccles, to be called Worsley and Eccles South.

Following council boundary changes that took effect in 2021, the electoral wards included in the Worsley and Eccles South constituency are currently Barton & Winton, Boothstown and Ellenbrook, Cadishead & Lower Irlam, Higher Irlam & Peel Green Ward, Little Hulton, Walkden North, Walkden South, Worsley & Westwood Park.

The electoral wards originally making up the seat were named Barton, Boothstown and Ellenbrook, Cadishead, Irlam, Little Hulton, Walkden North, Walkden South, Winton, Worsley.

Members of Parliament

Elections

Elections in the 2010s

See also
List of parliamentary constituencies in Greater Manchester

References

Politics of Salford
Parliamentary constituencies in Greater Manchester
Constituencies of the Parliament of the United Kingdom established in 2010